The Sanctuary of Imām 'Alī, also known as the Mosque of 'Alī, located in Najaf, Iraq, is a mosque which many Muslims believe contains the tomb of 'Alī ibn Abī Tālib, a cousin, son-in-law and companion of the Islamic prophet Muhammad. The Shī'as consider 'Alī as their first Imām, and the Sunnis regard him as the fourth Sunni Rashid Caliph. According to Shī'ite belief, buried next to 'Alī within this mosque are the remains of Adam and Nuh (Noah). Each year, millions of pilgrims visit the Shrine and pay tribute to Imām 'Alī.

History

The Abbasid caliph Harun al-Rashid built the first structure over the tomb of Imām 'Alī in 786, which included a green dome.

The caliph al-Mutawakkil flooded the site in 850, but Abu'l-Hayja, the Hamdanid ruler of Mosul and Aleppo, rebuilt the shrine in 923, which included a large dome.

In 979–980, the Buyid dynasty Shi'ite sovereign 'Adud al-Dawla expanded the shrine, which included a cenotaph over the burial site and a new dome. This included hanging textiles and carpets. He also protected Najaf with a wall and citadel, while providing water from the Euphrates via a qanat.

The Seljuq sultan Malik-Shah I contributed large gifts to the shrine in 1086, as did Caliph Al-Nasir.

The vizier Shams al-Din Juvayni added facilities to serve the pilgrims in 1267, and the sultan Ghazan Khan added the Dar al-Siyada wing for the sayyids in 1303.

Ibn Battuta visited the shrine in 1326, noting that it was "carpeted with various sorts of carpets of silk and other materials, and contains candelabra of gold and silver, large and small." Between the three tombs, "are dishes of gold and silver, containing rose-water, musk and various kinds of perfumes. The visitor dips his hand in this and anoints his face with it for a blessing." A fire destroyed the shrine in 1354, but it was rebuilt around 1358 by the Jalairid sultan Shaikh Awais Jalayir. He also interred his father's remains, Hasan Buzurg in the courtyard. Timur ordered the restoration of the shrine after a visit to Najaf. Suleiman the Magnificent also offered gifts, which probably helped restore the shrine, after a visit in 1534. The Safavid Shah Ismail I visited in 1508, but it was Abbas I who visited Najaf twice and commissioned 500 men to rebuild the shrine in 1623. The restoration was completed by his grandson Shah Safi al-Din in 1632. This restoration included a new dome, expanded courtyard, a hospital, kitchen, and hospice, so as to accommodate the numerous pilgrims. The cenotaph was restored in 1713 and the dome stabilized in 1716.

In 1742, Nader Shah gilded the dome and minaret, and this was chronicled by Nasrallah al-Haeri in his famous poem, iḏhā ḍhāmak al-dahra yawman wa jārā. Nader Shah's wife paid for the walls and courtyard to be rebuilt and the retiling of the iwan faience. In 1745, the iwan was rebuilt as a gilt muqarnas of nine tiers. In 1791, a raised stone floor covered the tombs in the courtyard, creating a cellar space for them.

The first European visitors included Carsten Niebuhr in 1765, William Loftus in 1853, and Johann Ludwig Burckhardt in 1864.  The Ottoman emperor Abdülaziz rebuilt the Clock Portal (Bab al-Sa'a) and the Portal of Muslim Ibn 'Aqil in 1863 and the former gilded in 1888 by the Qajar sultan Naser al-Din Shah Qajar. In 1886, Sultan Naser al-Din, also repaired the dome because there were breaks in it due to the weather.

Independent Iraq
During the uprising of March 1991, following the Persian Gulf War, Saddam Hussein's Republican Guards damaged the shrine, where members of the Shia opposition were cornered, in storming the shrine and massacring virtually all its occupants. Afterwards, the shrine was closed for two years, officially for repairs. Saddam Hussein also deported to Iran a large number of the residents of the area who were of Iranian descent.

In the three years after the 2003 invasion of Iraq by the U.S. military, a number of violent incidents occurred at the mosque:
 April 10, 2003: former Saddam Hussein era custodian Haydar Al-Killidar Al-Rufaye and anti-Saddam Shia leader Sayed Abdul Majid al-Khoei, the son of Grand Ayatollah Abu al Qasim al-Khoei, were killed by a mob near the mosque. Al-Khoei had returned from exile in Britain to encourage cooperation with the U.S.-led occupation of Iraq.
 August 29, 2003: a car bomb exploded outside the mosque just as the main Friday prayers were ending. Somewhere between 85 and 125 people were killed, including the influential Ayatollah Sayed Mohammed Baqir al-Hakim, the Shia leader of the Supreme Council for the Islamic Revolution in Iraq. The blast is thought to be the work of Abu Musab al-Zarqawi.
 May 24, 2004: unidentified mortar fire hit the shrine, damaging gates which lead to the tomb of Imam Ali.
 August 5, 2004: Muqtada al-Sadr and the Mahdi Army seized the mosque and used it as a military base for launching attacks against the Iraqi police, the provincial government and coalition forces. The fighting was eventually ended by a peace agreement. Neighbouring buildings suffered considerable damage, but the mosque itself suffered only superficial damage from stray bullets and shrapnel.
 August 10, 2006: a suicide bomber blew himself up near the shrine, killing 40 people and injuring more than 50 others.

Religious status and precincts

As the burial site of Shī'a Islam's second most important figure, the shrine of Imām 'Alī is considered by all Shī'a Muslims as the fourth holiest Islamic site. The Boston Globe reports "for the Muslim Shias, Najaf is the fourth holiest city, behind Mecca and Medina in Saudi Arabia and Al-Aqsa Mosque in Palestine." It is estimated that only Karbala, Mecca, and Medina receive more Muslim pilgrims. A hadith attributed to Ja'far as-Sādiq, the Sixth Imami Shī'ite Imām, mentions the site as one of "five definitive holy places that we respect very much".

The site is visited annually by at least 8 million pilgrims on average, which is estimated to increase to 20 million in years to come. Many Shī'ites believe that 'Alī did not want his grave to be desecrated by his enemies and consequently asked his friends and family to bury him secretly. This secret gravesite is supposed to have been revealed later during the Abbasid Caliphate by as-Sādiq. Most Shī'ites accept that 'Alī is buried in Imām 'Alī Mosque, in what is now the city of Najaf, which grew around the shrine.

It has also been narrated from as-Sādiq that Imām 'Alī Mosque is the third of five holiest Islamic sites: Mecca, Medina, Imām 'Alī Mosque in Najaf, Imam Husayn Shrine in Karbalā, and the Shrine of his daughter Fāṭimah in Qom.

Architecture and decoration
The Imām 'Alī Mosque is well known for its large dome. Near its main door are two minarets. The big dome is covered in 7777 brick slabs painted in gold, there are also turquoise mosaics that cover the side and back walls.

Entrance to the shrine is through three main monumental portals on the eastern, northern and southern sides, called the Main or Clock Portal, al-Tusi Portal and the Qibla Portal respectively. There are two additional monumental portals, the Portal of Muslim Ibn 'Aqil, north of the Clock Gate, and the al-'Amara, or al-Faraj Portal, at the southwestern corner. A courtyard surrounds the inner shrine, while the inner shrine is linked on the west to the Al-Ra's Mosque.

Gallery

See also

 Tomb of Noah

References

External links

 Official Website of the Shrine of Ali [Arabic, Persian and English]
 History of the Shrine of Ali
 GlobalSecurity.org website: past and current history of the mosque
 Mashhad Ali Amir al Muminin, An Najaf al Ashraf, Iraq

 
Religious buildings and structures completed in 977
10th-century mosques
Religious buildings and structures completed in 1500
15th-century mosques
Shia mosques in Iraq
Mosques in Iraq
Mausoleums in Iraq
Shia shrines
Tourist attractions in Iraq
Safavid architecture
Tomb of Noah
Shrines in Iraq